Now the Road of Knives is the third studio album by American noise rock band Gravitar, released on February 25, 1997 by Charnel Music.

Track listing

Personnel 
Adapted from the Now the Road of Knives liner notes.

Gravitar
 Eric Cook – drums, percussion
 Geoff Walker – vocals
 Michael J. Walker – electric guitar

Production and additional personnel
 John D'Agostini – production
 Warren Defever – recording (1, 5, 7, 10, 11, 14, 15)
 DES – illustrations
 Gravitar – recording (2, 3, 9, 13)
 Geoff Streadwick – recording (13)

Release history

References

External links 
 Now the Road of Knives at Discogs (list of releases)

1997 albums
Charnel Music albums
Gravitar (band) albums